Poul Moll Nielsen (21 April 1930 – 5 September 1992) was a Danish field hockey player. He competed at the 1948 Summer Olympics and the 1960 Summer Olympics.

References

External links
 

1930 births
1992 deaths
Danish male field hockey players
Olympic field hockey players of Denmark
Field hockey players at the 1948 Summer Olympics
Field hockey players at the 1960 Summer Olympics
People from Slagelse
Sportspeople from Region Zealand